The 1999 Swiss Figure Skating Championships (officially named  and ) were held in Lausanne from January 8 through 10th, 1999. Medals were awarded in the disciplines of men's singles, ladies' singles, and ice dancing.

Senior results

Men

Ladies

Ice dancing

References

External links
 results

Swiss Figure Skating Championships
Swiss Figure Skating Championships, 1999